This article describes all the 2015 seasons of TCR Series across the world.

Calendar
This table indicates the race number of each TCR Series according to weekend dates.

TCR International Series

TCR Russian Touring Car Championship
The 2015 TCR Russian Touring Car Championship season was the first season of the TCR Russian Touring Car Championship, which formed part of the Russian Circuit Racing Series, organised by SMP Racing Series. The series ran alongside the Super 2000 TC2 and the Super Production cars. Aleksey Dudukalo won the drivers' championship, driving a SEAT León Cup Racer, winning 9 of the season's 14 races, and reached the podium in them all. Lukoil Racing Team won the teams' championship.

The 2015 calendar consisted of seven rounds, with all events held in Russia. The fifth round was scheduled to be held at Autodrom Moscow, but it was later moved to the Smolensk Ring. The seventh round was scheduled to be held at Sochi Autodrom, but it was later moved to the Kazan Ring.

Drivers' championship
All races were held in Russia, with all teams and drivers Russian-registered. The Lukoil Racing Team used the SEAT León Cup Racer car, while the Ralf-Car Team used a Renault Clio RS at races 3–6 and a Renault Mégane RS at races 11–14. Yokohama was the official tyre supplier.

Scoring system

(key)

Teams' Championship

Notes

TCR Italian Series
The 2015 TCR Italian Series season was the first season of the TCR Italian Series. It was part of the Campionato Italiano Turismo Endurance, as the third division of the series. Valentina Albanese won the championship, winning 12 out of a possible 14 races, driving a SEAT León Cup Racer. Jordi Gené was the only driver to defeat her in the final race of the season at Mugello, while there was no winner in a race at Enna, as Albanese – the only starter – failed to finish.

The provisional 2015 schedule was announced on 27 January 2015, with all events scheduled to be held in Italy. On 9 February, the Monza round was postponed to 31 May due to organisational problems. For the same reasons, on 22 April the Magione round was also postponed to 14 June.

Drivers' championship
All races were held in Italy. All teams and drivers were Italian-registered, except for Spanish driver Jordi Gené. All teams used the SEAT León Cup Racer car, with Yokohama tyres.

Scoring system

(key)

TCR Asia Series

TCR Portuguese Series
The 2015 TCR Portuguese Series season was the first season of the TCR Portuguese Series. It was part of the Campeonato Nacional de Velocidade, organised by FullEventos, as one of the six categories of the touring class. Francisco Mora was the only competitor in the class, driving a SEAT León Cup Racer, and therefore won the championship unopposed.

The 2015 schedule was announced on 17 March 2015 and consisted of six rounds. Subsequently, the Jarama round scheduled for 31 May was cancelled, so the official schedule consisted of five rounds, all to be held in Portugal. However, the first three rounds – held at Braga, Portimão and Vila Real – did not see any TCR entries.

Drivers' championship
All races were held in Portugal. Portuguese driver Francisco Mora used a SEAT León Cup Racer car with Michelin tyres.

Scoring system

(key)

References

External links
 
 
 

TCR Series
TCR Series